Samuel Bonsall Campbell (July 2, 1846 – May 30, 1917)
was a Republican politician in the state of Ohio and was Ohio State Treasurer from 1896 to 1900.

Biography
Samuel B. Campbell was born July 2, 1846 at Jefferson County, Ohio, and attended public schools till age eleven, when he had to look after himself. He was a newsboy and clerk, and enlisted as soon as he was old enough when the American Civil War broke out. He enlisted in the One Hundred Fifty-seventh Ohio Volunteer Infantry Regiment. After the war he returned to Steubenville, Ohio and was connected with the Miners and Mechanics Bank.

In 1879, he was elected County Treasurer, and re-elected in 1881. In 1886, he was appointed by John C. Brown as cashier at the State Treasury, and in 1892 became chief clerk under Ohio Secretary of State Christian L. Poorman.

In 1895, Campbell won election as Ohio State Treasurer and was re-elected in 1897.

Campbell died May 30, 1917, and was interred at Green Lawn Cemetery, Columbus, Ohio.

Notes

References

State treasurers of Ohio
Ohio Republicans
People from Jefferson County, Ohio
1846 births
People of Ohio in the American Civil War
1917 deaths
Burials at Green Lawn Cemetery (Columbus, Ohio)
19th-century American politicians